Panayiotis "Yiotis" Engomitis (Greek: Παναγιώτης "Γιώτης" Εγκωμίτης; born 26 May 1972) is a Cypriot football coach and a former midfielder who played for Ethnikos Achnas, Anorthosis Famagusta and PAOK.

Honours
Anorthosis Famagusta: 
 Cypriot Cup: 1998

PAOK Thessaloniki:
 Greek Cup: 2001, 2003

External links
 
 

1972 births
Living people
Cypriot footballers
Cypriot expatriate footballers
Cyprus international footballers
Anorthosis Famagusta F.C. players
PAOK FC players
Ethnikos Achna FC players
Super League Greece players
Association football midfielders
People from Famagusta
Cypriot expatriate sportspeople in Greece
Expatriate footballers in Greece
Ethnikos Achna FC managers
Cypriot football managers